MagiQ Technologies, Inc., or MagiQ, is an American technology development company headquartered in Somerville, Massachusetts.  Established in 1999, it announced the availability of a commercial quantum key distribution product (Navajo) in 2003. Additional QKD systems (QPN 5505, QPN 7505, and QPN 8505) were released in 2004, 2005 and 2006.  Currently, MagiQ is providing solutions in the test and measurement, optical sensing, and communications markets for commercial and government customers.  Its government customers include DARPA, the U.S. Navy, NASA, and the U.S. Department of Energy.

Awards
 2004 Scientific American 50 
IEEE Spectrum “10 Tech Companies for the Next 10 Years” 2004 
World Economic Forum Technology Pioneer 2004

See also 
 Quantum key distribution
 Quantum Cryptography

References

Technology companies of the United States
Technology companies established in 1999
Technology companies based in Massachusetts
1999 establishments in Massachusetts